A list of films produced by the Tollywood (Bengali language film industry) based in Kolkata in the year 1999.

Highest-grossing
Jibon Niye Khela

A-Z of films

References

External links
 Tollywood films of 1999 at the Internet Movie Database

1999
Bengali
 Beng
1999 in Indian cinema